Boogertown is an unincorporated community in Gaston County, North Carolina,  United States.

Moonshiners who warned that the bogeyman lurked in the forest in order to deter visitors caused the name Boogertown to be selected.

References

Unincorporated communities in Gaston County, North Carolina
Unincorporated communities in North Carolina